The Republic House  (House of the Republic) is the headquarters of the Government of the Republic of Bashkortostan, the Constitutional Court of the Republic of Bashkortostan  and the Head of Bashkortostan. It is located in the national capital, Ufa.

The Republic House  is located in Tukaeva Street, 46.

The House was built in 1979. It consists of five floors. The walls are built of bricks. The House is rectangular, 105 meters in length and 95 meters in width.

The building also hosts:
Ministry of Finance
Ministry of Economic Development

See also
Gosagroprom Building

References

 Some

External links
 
 Interactive tour to Head of Bashkortostan

Buildings and structures in Ufa